Hypsopygia decoloralis is a species of snout moth in the genus Hypsopygia. It was described by Julius Lederer in 1863 and is found in Australia.

The wingspan is about 30 mm. Adults have brown wings with a pale submarginal line.

References

Moths described in 1863
Pyralini